In scientific visualization, line integral convolution (LIC) is a  method to visualize a vector field, such as fluid motion.

Features
 global method
 integration-based method 
 texture-based method

Convolution
In signal processing this process is known as discrete convolution.

Integration-based method  
It is the integration-based method (technique). More precisely it is based on the discrete line integral on uniform grids. Discrete numerical integration is performed along a line ( more precisely curve). Line here means field line of vector field.

Global method
Compared to other integration-based techniques that compute field lines of the input vector field, LIC has the advantage that all structural features of the vector field are displayed, without the need to adapt the start and end points of field lines to the specific vector field. In other words, itr shows the topology of the vector field.

In user testing, LIC was found to be particularly good for identifying critical points.

other

With the availability of high-performance GPU-based implementations, the former disadvantage of limited interactivity is no longer present.

Texture-based methood
LIC takes texture as an input and gives texture ( output). So it is texture synthesis.

History
LIC technique was proposed by Brian Cabral and Leith Casey Leedom

Algorithm

Informal description 

Principle : the pixel values ​​along the field lines are strongly correlated, but orthogonally to them almost uncorrelated. As a result, the field lines stand out visually from the background and become visible.

Intuition:
 throwing paint in a river
 visualisation of magnetic field lines using randomly distributed iron filings
 "emulates what happens when a rectangular area of massless fine sand is blown by strong wind"

Intuitively, the flow of a vector field in some domain is visualized by adding a static random pattern of dark and light paint sources. As the flow passes by the sources, each parcel of fluid picks up some of the source color, averaging it with the color it has already acquired in a manner similar to throwing paint in a river. The result is a random striped texture where points along the same streamline tend to have similar color.

Formal mathematical description 
Although the input vector field and the result image are discretized, it pays to look at it from a continuous viewpoint. Let  be the vector field given in some domain . Streamlines, or more generally field lines, are tangent to the vector field in each point. For the sake of simplicity, in the following critical points and boundaries are ignored.

 has to be computed for each pixel in the LIC image. If carried out naively, this is quite expensive. First, the field lines have to be computed using a numerical method for solving ordinary differential equations, like a Runge–Kutta method, and then for each pixel the convolution along a field line segment has to be calculated.

The output image will normally be colored in some way.

Different choices of convolution kernels and random noise produce different textures: for example pink noise produces a cloudy pattern where areas of higher flow stand out as smearing, suitable for weather visualization. Further refinements in the convolution can improve the quality of the image.

description for programmers
Algorithmically, the technique starts by generating in the domain of the vector field a random gray level image at the desired output resolution. Then, for every pixel in this image, the forward and backward streamline of a fixed arc length is calculated. The value assigned to the current pixel is computed by a convolution of a suitable convolution kernel with the gray levels of all the pixels lying on a segment of this streamline. This creates a gray level LIC image.

Problem
Visualise field lines and singularities of a 2D stationary vector field (stream lines of a 2D steady flow)

Input
 vector field: 2D stationary vector field
 noise: stationary white noise (scalar field =  texture)

Output
result (output image) = final LIC image of input vector field

Steps

constraints 
  false singularities

Versions

Basic

Basic LIC images are grayscale images, without color and animation. While such LIC image conveys the orientation of the field vectors, it does not indicate their direction; for stationary fields, this can be remedied by animation. Basic LIC images do not show the length of the vectors (or the strength of the field).

Color

The length of the vectors (or the strength of the field) is usually coded in color; alternatively, animation can be used.

Animated version 

LIC images can be animated by using a kernel that changes over time. Samples at a constant time from the streamline would still be used, but instead of averaging all pixels in a streamline with a static kernel, a ripple-like kernel constructed from a periodic function multiplied by a Hann function acting as a window (in order to prevent artifacts) is used. The periodic function is then shifted along the period to create an animation.

FLIC
Fast Lic ( FLIC)

The computation can be significantly accelerated by re-using parts of already computed field lines, specializing to a box function as convolution kernel  and avoiding redundant computations during convolution. The resulting fast LIC method can be generalized to convolution kernels that are arbitrary polynomials.

OLIC
Oriented Line Integral Convolution (OLIC)
 Fast Rendering of Oriented Line Integral Convolution ( FROLIC)

UFLIC 

For time-dependent vector fields ( unsteady flow) a variant (UFLIC = Unsteady Flow LIC), has been designed that maintains the coherence of the flow animation.

Parallel versions 

Since the computation of a LIC image is expensive but inherently parallel, it has also been parallelized and, with availability of GPU-based implementations, it has become interactive on PCs. Also for UFLIC an interactive GPU-based implementation has been presented.

Multidimensional
Note that domain  does not have to be a 2D domain: the method is applicable to higher dimensional domains using multidimensional noise fields. However, the visualization of the higher-dimensional LIC texture is problematic; one way is to use interactive exploration with 2D slices that are manually positioned and rotated. The domain  does not have to be flat either; the LIC texture can be computed also for arbitrarily shaped 2D surfaces in 3D space.

Applications
This technique has been applied to a wide range of problems since it first was published in 1993.

Applications: 
 representing vector fields by approximation a field lines of the input vector field
 flow-visualization method for steady ( time independent) flows. Here field lines are called stremlines
 Visual exploration of 2D autonomous dynamical systems
 windy maps
 water directions
 artistic effects to generate fancy images
 pencil drawing
 automatic pencil drawing generation technique using LIC pencil filter
 Automatic generation of hair texture
 creating marbling texture
 Terrain generalization: creating generalized shaded relief

Implementations
 GPU Based Image Processing Tools by Raymond McGuire
 ParaView : Line Integral Convolution
 A 2D flow visualization tool based on LIC and RK4. Developed using C++ and VTK. by  Andres Bejarano
 Wolfram Research (2008), LineIntegralConvolutionPlot, Wolfram Language function, https://reference.wolfram.com/language/ref/LineIntegralConvolutionPlot.html (updated 2014).

See also
 Weighted arithmetic mean or Weighted average

References 

Numerical function drawing
Vector calculus
Fluid dynamics
Complex analysis
Computer graphics